Thomas Michael Carroll  (born November 5, 1952) is a former Major League Baseball pitcher for the Cincinnati Reds.

The Reds selected Carroll in the sixth round of the June 1970 Major League Baseball draft out of North Allegheny High School in Pittsburgh, Pennsylvania at age 17. At 18, Carroll went 18–5 with a 2.39 earned run average and 148 strikeouts with the Florida State League's Tampa Tarpons. At 20, in 1973, Carroll went 15-9 for AAA Indianapolis.

Carroll tossed a no-hitter against Omaha for the Indianapolis Indians in 1974 to improve his career minor league record to 51–33 with a 3.38 ERA when he received his first call to the majors. He made his major league debut on July 7,  at Riverfront Stadium. Facing Bob Forsch (who was also making his major league debut) in the first game of a doubleheader with the St. Louis Cardinals, he held the Cardinals to just two hits over seven innings while striking out six. The Reds went on to win in each of Carroll's first seven starts and at that point, he was 4–0 with 3 no decisions.  He left the game after seven innings of his eighth start, giving up 3 hits and one run.  The Reds eventually lost 2–1. He lost his final three decisions of the year, and ended the season 4–3 with a 3.68 ERA.

He began the  season with the AAA Indianapolis Indians, but got a call to the majors when Reds starter Don Gullett fractured his left thumb. Immediately starting upon his arrival, he won his first two games, beating Houston 4-3 and then throwing 8 shutout innings against Atlanta, giving up three hits. On August 2, Carroll pitched 6 1/3 scoreless innings against the Dodgers in front of 52,015 fans.   Clay Carroll came in in relief and together they beat Andy Messersmith and Mike Marshall 1–0.  It would be his last major league win.  He finished the season 4–1 with a 4.98 ERA in place of Gullett. Though he did not participate in the Big Red Machine's  World Series victory over the Boston Red Sox, he was voted a three-quarter World Series share by his teammates.

He struggled with arm problems for the rest of his career and spent the  season with Indianapolis, going 9–15 with a 5.38 ERA. Following the season, the Reds traded him to the Pittsburgh Pirates for Jim Sadowski. He was then taken from the Pirates, the first selection in the 1976 Rule V draft by the Montreal Expos.

Carroll earned Bachelor's and master's degrees from Georgetown University and spent 28 years (where he worked as Dept. Chief Analyst, Dept. Chief Engineer, Portfolio Division Manager and Sr. Principal) with MITRE Corporation.

He is an adjunct professor in Georgetown University's School of Foreign Service where he teaches courses on international security.

Career stats
As a hitter, one of his four career singles came on July 17, 1974, against Bob Gibson as Gibson stood with 2999 career strikeouts. The next batter, César Gerónimo, ended up being Gibson's three thousandth career strikeout.

References

External links

Baseball players from New York (state)
Cincinnati Reds players
Alexandria Dukes players
West Palm Beach Expos players
Major League Baseball pitchers
1952 births
Living people
Sioux Falls Packers players
Tampa Tarpons (1957–1987) players
Trois-Rivières Aigles players
Indianapolis Indians players
Denver Bears players